Paulus I may refer to:

 Paul I of Constantinople (died ca. 350)
 Pope Paul I (700–767)